Markus Wostry (born 19 July 1992) is an Austrian footballer.

Club career
On 21 August 2020, he joined Wacker Innsbruck.

On 6 July 2021, he moved to First Vienna.

References

1992 births
Living people
Austrian footballers
Association football defenders
FC Admira Wacker Mödling players
LASK players
FC Wacker Innsbruck (2002) players
First Vienna FC players
Austrian Football Bundesliga players
2. Liga (Austria) players
Austrian Regionalliga players
Footballers from Vienna